Facundo Axel Medina (born 28 May 1999) is an Argentine professional footballer who plays as a centre-back or left-back for  club Lens and the Argentina national team.

Club career
Medina's career got underway with a stint with River Plate, who he was an unused substitute for four times during the 2016–17 Argentine Primera División season. In January 2018, Medina completed a move to fellow Argentine Primera División side Talleres. After featuring for their U20s at the 2018 U-20 Copa Libertadores in February, he made his first league appearances in August when he played in matches against Boca Juniors, Rosario Central and Gimnasia y Esgrima. He scored his first senior goal in February 2020 against Huracán. After a total of 37 appearances for Talleres, Medina departed in July 2020 to Ligue 1 side Lens.

Medina netted his first goal for Lens on 13 September against Lorient, scoring with an overhead kick as his side won 3–2 away from home. He scored again on 3 February 2021 during a 2–2 draw at home to Marseille. His third Lens goal arrived on his Coupe de France starting debut in a defeat away to Red Star of Championnat National on 6 March. On 18 January 2023, he extends his contract with Lens until 2026.

International career
After playing in all three of Talleres' fixtures at the beginning of 2018–19, Medina received a call-up to the Argentina U20 squad. He subsequently featured on 29 August 2018 in a friendly with Uruguay. He had previous experience with the U20s during his time with River Plate, and was also called up to train against the senior squad during the 2018 FIFA World Cup in Russia. In December, Medina was selected for the 2019 South American U-20 Championship. He was also picked for the subsequent FIFA U-20 World Cup. He featured eleven times in the tournaments. Medina was called by the U23s for the 2019 Pan American Games.

Medina appeared in all five of Argentina's matches at the Pan American Games, as they came away with the trophy after defeating Honduras in the final. In September 2020, having won the 2020 CONMEBOL Pre-Olympic Tournament with the U23s months earlier, Medina received his first call-up to the Argentina senior squad from manager Lionel Scaloni. He debuted in a 2022 FIFA World Cup qualifying victory away to Bolivia on 13 October, after replacing Lautaro Martínez for the final moments at the Estadio Hernando Siles.

Career statistics

Club

International

Honours
Argentina U23
Pan American Games: 2019
CONMEBOL Pre-Olympic Tournament: 2020

References

External links

1999 births
Living people
People from Lomas de Zamora Partido
Argentine footballers
Argentina international footballers
Argentina youth international footballers
Argentina under-20 international footballers
Footballers at the 2019 Pan American Games
Pan American Games gold medalists for Argentina
Pan American Games medalists in football
Association football defenders
Argentine expatriate footballers
Expatriate footballers in France
Argentine expatriate sportspeople in France
Argentine Primera División players
Ligue 1 players
Club Atlético River Plate footballers
Talleres de Córdoba footballers
RC Lens players
Medalists at the 2019 Pan American Games
Olympic footballers of Argentina
Footballers at the 2020 Summer Olympics
Sportspeople from Buenos Aires Province